Specctra is a commercial PCB auto-router originally developed by John F. Cooper and David Chyan of Cooper & Chyan Technology, Inc. (CCT) in 1989. The company and product were taken over by Cadence Design Systems in May 1997. Since its integration into Cadence's Allegro PCB Editor, the name of the router is Allegro PCB Router. The latest version is 17.4 - 22.1 (October 20 2022).

Specctra routes boards by presenting graphical data using a "shape-based" technology which represents graphical objects not as a set of points-coordinates, but more compact. This increases the efficiency of routing printed circuit boards with a high density of components, provides automatic routing of the same chain of tracks of different widths and more.

Specctra uses adaptive algorithms implemented in multiple trace runs. The routing is carried out in three stages:

 preview routing
 autoroute
 additional processing of autoroute results

On the first pass, the connection of all conductors is performed, regardless of the presence of conflicts, which consist in crossing the conductors on one layer and breaking the gaps. On each subsequent pass, the auto-router tries to reduce the number of conflicts by breaking and re-building connections (the ripup-and-retry router method) and pushing the conductors by pushing the neighboring ones (the push-and-shove router method). Electromagnetic compatibility can be tested in Specctra through the "SPECCTRAQuest SI Expert" module.

The program is compatible with many design systems for printed circuit boards, thanks to the use of industrial-standard DSN design file format for project description and Do-files to specify routing strategies.
The results are returned to the board editor via SES session files as well as RTE files. Protocol command execution is recorded in Did-file, which after editing can be used as new Do-files.

The DSN/SES file formats are also supported by a number of other auto-routers including KONEKT ELECTRA, Eremex TopoR, Alfons Wirtz's FreeRouting and RL-based DeepPCB.

List of EDA tools supporting Specctra 
 ACCEL PCB
 Cadence Allegro
 Cadnetix
 CADVANCE V / α
 DK-/DK-Magic
 DREAM CAD
 EAGLE (via BRD_TO_DSN.ULP etc.)
 KiCad
 Mentor BoardStation
 MyPCB
 OrCAD Layout
 PADS Perform / PowerPCB
 PLANET
 PLASMA
 Protel Advanced PCB
 Providence
 SCS-1
 TARGET 3001!
 U-Art
 ULTIboard
 Vanguard PCB
 WorkBrain
 Zuken CR-3000 / CR-5000
 Zuken Visula / Zuken CadStar

See also 
 OrCAD
 Proteus
 P-CAD

References

Further reading
 
 
 
  (16 pages)

External links 
 http://www.cadence.com/products/pcb/pcb_design/pages/default.aspx Official website
 http://www.dsioffe.narod.ru/myspecctra

Electronic design automation software